The 2022 ICC Under-19 Cricket World Cup took place in the West Indies in January and February 2022. South Africa were the first team to name their team, with the following squads selected for the tournament.

Afghanistan
Afghanistan's squad was announced on 4 December 2021.

 Suliman Safi (c)
 Ijaz Ahmadzai (vc)
 Bilal Ahmad
 Noor Ahmad
 Mohammad Ishaq (wk)
 Ijaz Ahmad
 Khalil Ahmad
 Suliman Arabzai
 Abdul Hadi (wk)
 Shahid Hassani
 Faisal Khan
 Nangyalai Khan
 Mohammadullah Najibullah
 Izharulhaq Naveed
 Allah Noor
 Bilal Sami
 Bilal Sayeedi
 Khyber Wali
 Younis
 Naweed Zadran

Australia
Australia's squad was announced on 14 December 2021, with Cooper Connolly named as the captain of the team.

 Cooper Connolly (c)
 Harkirat Bajwa
 Aidan Cahill
 Joshua Garner
 Isaac Higgins
 Campbell Kellaway
 Corey Miller
 Jack Nisbet
 Nivethan Radhakrishnan
 William Salzmann
 Lachlan Shaw
 Jackson Sinfield
 Tobias Snell
 Tom Whitney
 Teague Wyllie

Liam Blackford, Liam Doddrell, Joel Davies, Sam Rahaley and Aubrey Stockdale were all named as reserve players.

Bangladesh
Bangladesh's squad was announced on 7 December 2021.

 Rakibul Hasan (c)
 Prantik Nawrose Nabil (vc)
 Mohammad Fahim
 Mushfik Hasan
 Iftikher Hossain
 Ariful Islam
 Mahfijul Islam
 Tahjibul Islam
 Abdullah Al Mamun
 SM Meherob
 Aich Mollah
 Ripon Mondol
 Naimur Rohman
 Tanzim Hasan Sakib
 Ashikur Zaman

Ahosan Habib and Jishan Alam were both named as reserve players, with Mohiuddin Tareq, Tawhidul Islam Ferdus, Shakib Shahriyer and Golam Kibria named as standby players.

Canada
Canada's squad was announced on 8 December 2021.

 Mihir Patel (c)
 Sahil Badin
 Anoop Chima (wk)
 Ethan Gibson
 Parmveer Kharoud
 Siddh Ladd (wk)
 Yasir Mahmood
 Gavin Niblock
 Sheel Patel
 Mohit Prashar
 Harjap Saini
 Jash Shah
 Kairav Sharma
 Gurnek Johal Singh
 Arjuna Sukhu

Ramanvir Dhaliwal, Eran Maliduwapathirana, Yash Mondkar and Ayush Singh were also named as reserve players.

England
England's squad was announced on 22 December 2021. On 16 January 2022, Sonny Baker was ruled out of England's squad due to a back injury, with Ben Cliff named as his replacement.

 Tom Prest (c)
 Jacob Bethell (vc)
 Rehan Ahmed
 Tom Aspinwall
 Sonny Baker
 Nathan Barnwell
 George Bell
 Josh Boyden
 Ben Cliff
 James Coles
 Alex Horton
 Will Luxton
 James Rew
 James Sales
 Fateh Singh
 George Thomas

Josh Baker and Ben Cliff were also named as reserve players.

India
India's squad was announced on 19 December 2021.

 Yash Dhull (c)
 Shaik Rasheed (vc)
 Dinesh Bana (wk)
 Raj Bawa
 Aneeshwar Gautam
 Rajvardhan Hangargekar
 Vicky Ostwal
 Manav Parakh
 Angkrish Raghuvanshi
 Ravi Kumar
 Garv Sangwan
 Nishant Sindhu
 Harnoor Singh
 Kaushal Tambe
 Vasu Vats
 Aaradya Yadav (wk)
 Siddarth Yadav

Rishith Reddy, Uday Saharan, Ansh Gosai, Amrit Raj Upadhyay and PM Singh Rathore were also named as reserve players.

Ireland
Ireland's squad was announced on 15 December 2021.

 Tim Tector (c)
 Diarmuid Burke
 Joshua Cox
 Jack Dickson
 Liam Doherty
 Jamie Forbes
 Daniel Forkin
 Matthew Humphreys
 Philippe le Roux
 Scott Macbeth
 Nathan McGuire
 Muzamil Sherzad
 David Vincent
 Luke Whelan
 Reuben Wilson

Robbie Millar, Ryan Hunter and Ewan Wilson were also named as reserve players.

Pakistan
Pakistan's squad was announced on 2 December 2021. On 6 January 2022, Abdul Bangalzai was ruled out of the tournament following a positive test for COVID-19 with Abbas Ali named as his replacement.

 Qasim Akram (c)
 Faisal Akram
 Abbas Ali
 Awais Ali
 Ali Asfand
 Abdul Bangalzai
 Abdul Faseeh
 Haseebullah Khan (wk)
 Ahmed Khan
 Rizwan Mehmood
 Mehran Mumtaz
 Arham Nawab
 Irfan Khan
 Maaz Sadaqat
 Mohammad Shehzad
 Zeeshan Zameer

Ghazi Ghori and Mohammad Zeeshan were also named as reserve players.

Papua New Guinea
Papua New Guinea's squad was announced on 22 December 2021.

 Barnabas Maha (c)
 Ryan Ani
 Malcolm Aporo
 Toua Boe
 John Kariko
 Peter Karoho
 Sigo Kelly
 Karoho Kevau
 Rasan Kevau
 Christopher Kilapat
 Junior Morea
 Patrick Nou
 Aue Oru
 Boio Ray
 Katenalaki Singi

Vele Kariko, Gata Mika and Api Ila were also named as reserve players.

Scotland
Scotland's squad was announced on 23 December 2021.

 Charlie Peet (c)
 Jamie Cairns
 Christopher Cole
 Aayush Das Mahapatra
 Oliver Davidson
 Sam Elstone
 Sean Fischer-Keogh
 Gabriel Gallman-Findlay
 Jack Jarvis
 Rafay Khan
 Tom Macintosh
 Muhaymen Majeed
 Ruaridh McIntyre
 Lyle Robertson
 Charlie Tear

H Ali, F Huddleston, J Lambley, M Layton and D Stevenswere also named as reserve players.

South Africa
South Africa's squad was announced on 17 November 2021.

 George Van Heerden (c)
 Liam Alder
 Matthew Boast
 Dewald Brevis
 Mickey Copeland
 Ethan Cunningham
 Valentine Kitime
 Kwena Maphaka
 Gerhard Maree
 Aphiwe Mnyanda
 Andile Simelane
 Jade Smith
 Kaden Solomons
 Joshua Stephenson
 Asakhe Tshaka

Hardus Coetzer, Ronan Hermann and Caleb Seleka were also named as reserve players.

Sri Lanka
Sri Lanka's squad was announced on 2 January 2022.

 Dunith Wellalage (c)
 Raveen de Silva (vc)
 Anjala Bandara
 Shevon Daniel
 Sadeesh Jayawardena
 Abhisheak Liyanaarachchi
 Sakuna Liyanage
 Traveen Mathew
 Pawan Pathiraja
 Matheesha Pathirana
 Sadisha Rajapaksa
 Vinuja Ranpul
 Yasiru Rodrigo
 Wanuja Sahan
 Ranuda Somarathne
 Malsha Tharupathi
 Chamidu Wickramasinghe

Uganda
Uganda's squad was announced on 7 December 2021.

 Pascal Murungi (c)
 Ismail Munir (vc)
 Brian Asaba
 Isaac Ategeka
 Joseph Baguma
 Cyrus Kakuru
 Christopher Kidega
 Ronald Lutaaya
 Juma Miyaji
 Matthew Musinguzi
 Akram Nsubuga
 Edwin Nuwagaba
 Pius Oloka
 Ronald Omara
 Ronald Opio

Fahad Mutagana, Abdallah Muhammad, Raima Musa, Jaffer Ochaya and Yunus Sowobi were also named as reserve players.

West Indies
The West Indies' squad was announced on 3 December 2021.

 Ackeem Auguste (c)
 Giovonte Depeiza (vc)
 Onaje Amory
 Teddy Bishop
 Carlon Bowen-Tuckett
 Jaden Carmichael
 McKenny Clarke
 Rivaldo Clarke
 Jordan Johnson
 Johann Layne
 Anderson Mahase
 Matthew Nandu
 Shaqkere Parris
 Shiva Sankar
 Isai Thorne

Anderson Amurdan, Nathan Edward, Andel Gordon, Vasant Singh and Kevin Wickham were also named as reserve players.

United Arab Emirates
The United Arab Emirates' squad was announced on 4 January 2022.

 Alishan Sharafu (c)
 Shival Bawa
 Jash Giyanani
 Sailles Jaishankar
 Nilansh Keswani
 Aayan Khan
 Punya Mehra
 Ali Aamer Naseer
 Ronak Panoly
 Dhruv Parashar
 Vinayak Vijaya Raghavan
 Soorya Sathish
 Aryansh Sharma
 Adithya Shetty
 Kai Smith

Hassan Khalid, Annant Bhargava, Muhammad Zuhaib and Hamad Mohammed Arshad were also named as reserve players.

Zimbabwe
Zimbabwe's squad was announced on 28 December 2021.

 Emmanuel Bawa (c)
 Brian Bennett (c)
 David Bennett
 Victor Chirwa
 Mgcini Dube
 Alex Falao
 Tendekai Mataranyika
 Tashinga Makoni
 Connor Mitchell
 Steven Saul
 Matthew Schonken
 Panashe Taruvinga
 Matthew Welch
 Rogan Wolhuter
 Ngenyasha Zvinoera

Aisha Chibanda, Tanaka Zvaita, Luyanda Mtomba, Tadiwanashe Mwale and Declan Rugg were also named as reserve players.

References

External links
 Squad lists at ESPN Cricinfo

2022
Squads